Hilltop or Hill Top is the top of a hill and may refer to:

Place names

England
 Hill Top, Cumbria, a house in England
 Hill Top, Stanley, County Durham, England
 Hill Top, Teesdale, County Durham, England
 Hilltop, Buckinghamshire

United States

 Hilltop, Arizona
 Hilltop, the former name of Fuller Acres, California
 Hilltop, Denver, Colorado
 Hilltop, Georgia
 Hill Top, Illinois
 Hilltop, Kentucky (disambiguation)
 Hill Top, Maryland
 Hilltop, Minnesota
 Hilltop, Nevada
 Hilltop, Jersey City, New Jersey
 Hilltop, Ohio, a census-designated place in Trumbull County
 Hilltop, Columbus, Ohio, a neighborhood
 Hilltop, Pennsylvania
 Hilltop, South Carolina
 Hilltop, Texas
 Hilltop, Starr County, Texas
 Hill Top, West Virginia
 Hilltop, Tacoma, Washington, a neighborhood
 Fairmede-Hilltop, Richmond, California, commonly referred to as "Hilltop"
 Prologis Hilltop Center, Richmond, California, formerly known as Hilltop Mall

Elsewhere
 Hill Top, New South Wales, Australia
 Hilltop, Alberta, Canada
 Hilltop, Manitoba, Canada
 Hilltop, New Zealand, suburb of Taupō

Arts, entertainment, and media
 Hilltop Hoods, an Australian hip-hop group
 "Hilltop", the iconic Coca-Cola commercial by McCann Erikson that introduced the song, "I'd Like to Teach the World to Sing (In Perfect Harmony)"
 Hilltop, a fictional walled community introduced in The Walking Dead (season 6)

Other uses
 Hilltop (Staunton, Virginia), a historic building on the Mary Baldwin University campus
 Hilltop algorithm, an algorithm used to find topic-relevant documents to a particular keyword topic, acquired by Google
 Hilltop F.C., a football club based in Stonebridge, London, England
  or Hilltop Hotel, an Art Deco-style hotel in Tokyo, Japan
 Hilltop, an acute care center at the former mental hospital Haverford State Hospital, Haverford Township, Pennsylvania

See also
 Hilltop Manor (disambiguation)
 The Hilltop (disambiguation)
 Hill-topping (disambiguation)